The Oakland Athletics' 1990 season was their 23rd season  in Oakland, California. It was also the 90th season in franchise history. The team finished first in the American League West with a record of 103 wins 59 losses.

The Athletics' 1990 campaign ranks among the organization's finest. Oakland, in winning 103 games, led the league outright in wins for a third consecutive season; they remained the last major North American team to accomplish this until 2017, when the feat was matched by the nearby Golden State Warriors of the NBA. The Athletics benefited from stellar performances in all areas of the game. The team's offense was led by eventual Hall-of-Famer Rickey Henderson, who finished the season with 65 stolen bases, 28 home runs, a .325 batting average, and took home the 1990 American League MVP Award. The Athletics also benefited from strong performances by superstars Mark McGwire and Jose Canseco. The pair clubbed 39 and 37 home runs, respectively; in doing so, they drove in a combined total of 209 runs. Over the course of the season, the team added to an already strong offense; the additions of recent All-Stars Willie Randolph, Willie McGee, and Harold Baines further widened the gap between the Athletics and the rest of the league. Established veterans (such as Carney Lansford, Terry Steinbach, Dave Henderson, and Mike Gallego) and promising young players (mainly Walt Weiss and Mike Bordick) rounded out arguably the deepest roster in all of Major League Baseball. Eight of the Athletics' nine main postseason starters (R. Henderson, McGwire, Canseco, McGee, Steinbach, Randolph, Baines, and Lansford) played in at least one All-Star Game between 1988 and 1990.

The Athletics pitching staff, in many regards, had an even stronger campaign. The starting rotation was led by veteran Bob Welch. Welch would finish the season with both an MLB-leading 27 wins and a 2.95 ERA; this performance was strong enough to net the 1990 Cy Young Award. Welch, as of 2021, remains the last MLB pitcher to win at least 25 games in a season. Fellow starter Dave Stewart, winner of 22 games, finished in a tie (with Pittsburgh starter Doug Drabek) for the second-most wins in MLB. 1989 All-Star Mike Moore, 1991 All-Star Scott Sanderson, and longtime Athletic Curt Young rounded out the American League's top rotation. The Athletics' bullpen was led by superstar closer Dennis Eckersley, who posted a microscopic 0.61 ERA while recording 48 saves. As a team, the Athletics allowed only 570 runs (the fewest in the American League by a wide margin).

The Athletics easily won the American League West for a third consecutive season, en route to a third consecutive AL Pennant with a four-game sweep of the Boston Red Sox.  The Athletics entered the 1990 World Series as heavy favorites, but were swept by the Cincinnati Reds. Neither team has reached the World Series since.

Offseason
 November 28, 1989: Rickey Henderson signed as a free agent with the Oakland Athletics.
 December 13, 1989: The Athletics sign Scott Sanderson as a free agent.
 December 13, 1989: Jamie Quirk was signed as a free agent with the Oakland Athletics.

Regular season

 June 4, 1990: Todd Van Poppel was drafted by the Oakland Athletics in the 1st round (14th pick) of the 1990 amateur draft. Player signed July 16, 1990.
 June 20, 1990 – Terry Steinbach has 6 RBIs in one game versus the Detroit Tigers.
 July 25, 1990 – Jose Canseco had 6 RBIs in a game against the California Angels.

Season standings

Record vs. opponents

Notable transactions
 May 13, 1990: Willie Randolph was traded by the Los Angeles Dodgers to the Oakland Athletics for Stan Javier.
 June 17, 1990: Ken Phelps was purchased by the Cleveland Indians from the Oakland Athletics.
July 15, 1990: Mike Norris was released by the Oakland Athletics.
 August 1, 1990: Ron Coomer was released by the Oakland Athletics.
 August 29, 1990: Willie McGee was traded by the St. Louis Cardinals to the Oakland Athletics for Felix Jose, Stan Royer, and Daryl Green (minors).

Draft picks
June 4, 1990: Ernie Young was drafted by the Oakland Athletics in the 10th round of the 1990 amateur draft. Player signed June 7, 1990.
 June 4, 1990: Izzy Molina was drafted by the Oakland Athletics in the 22nd round of the 1990 amateur draft. Player signed June 28, 1990.

Roster

Dave Stewart's No-Hitter
On June 29, Dave Stewart no-hit the Toronto Blue Jays by a score of 5–0.

Player stats

Batting

Starters by position
Note: Pos = Position; G = Games played; AB = At bats; H = Hits; Avg. = Batting average; HR = Home runs; RBI = Runs batted in

Other batters
Note: G = Games played; AB = At bats; H = Hits; Avg. = Batting average; HR = Home runs; RBI = Runs batted in

Pitching

Starting pitchers
Note: G = Games pitched; IP = Innings pitched; W = Wins; L = Losses; ERA = Earned run average; SO = Strikeouts

Other pitchers
Note: G = Games pitched; IP = Innings pitched; W = Wins; L = Losses; ERA = Earned run average; SO = Strikeouts

Relief pitchers
Note: G = Games pitched; W = Wins; L = Losses; SV = Saves; ERA = Earned run average; SO = Strikeouts

ALCS

Game 1
October 6, 1990, at Fenway Park

Game 2
October 7, 1990, at Fenway Park

Game 3
October 9, 1990, at Oakland–Alameda County Coliseum

Game 4
October 10, 1990, at Oakland–Alameda County Coliseum

The 1990 World Series

The four-game sweep to the Reds in the 1990, was reminiscent of the A's loss to the Boston Braves 76 years earlier.

NL Cincinnati Reds (4) vs. AL Oakland Athletics (0)

Awards and honors
 Rickey Henderson, American League Most Valuable Player
 Dave Stewart, ALCS MVP
 Dave Stewart, Pitcher, Roberto Clemente Award
 Bob Welch, AL Cy Young Award
All-Star Game
 Jose Canseco, outfielder
 Dennis Eckersley, relief pitcher
 Rickey Henderson, outfielder
 Mark McGwire, first baseman
 Bob Welch, starting pitcher
 Tony La Russa, manager

Team leaders
 Home Runs – Mark McGwire (39)
 RBI –  Mark McGwire (108)
 Batting Average – Rickey Henderson (.325)
 Hits – Rickey Henderson (159)
 Stolen Bases – Rickey Henderson (65)
 Walks –  Mark McGwire (110)
 Wins – Bob Welch (27)
 Earned Run Average – Dave Stewart (2.56)
 Strikeouts – Dave Stewart (166)

Farm system

References

1990 Oakland Athletics team page at Baseball Reference
1990 Oakland Athletics team page at www.baseball-almanac.com

Oakland Athletics seasons
Oakland Athletics season
American League West champion seasons
American League champion seasons
Oak